Michael Stephenson or Stevenson may refer to:

Michael Stephenson (filmmaker) (born 1978), American film director, producer, writer and actor
Michael Stephenson (rugby union) (born 1980), English rugby union footballer
Mike Stephenson (born 1947), English rugby league player and commentator
Michael Stevenson (educator) (born 1953), President Emeritus and Vice-Chancellor of Simon Fraser University
Mike Stevenson (1927–1994), British cricketer
Michael Stevenson (actor), English actor
Michael Stevenson (cyclist) (born 1984), Swedish cyclist
Micheal Ray Stevenson (born 1989), American rapper, known as Tyga